Paul McKercher is an Australian record producer, audio engineer, sound mixer and multi-instrumentalist. He has received five ARIA Artisan Awards and has produced over 50 albums. McKercher has worked with Australian artists Josh Pyke, Bertie Blackman, Papa vs Pretty, Sarah Blasko, You Am I, Pete Murray, Motor Ace and Eskimo Joe. An avowed analogue fan, he specialises in the use of tape, although he also uses digital technologies.

Biography 

Paul McKercher worked at national youth radio station, Triple J, for three years. In 1991 he and fellow audio engineer John Jacobs created the "JJJ News Theme" as a mix of McKercher's guitar playing, a scratch of N.W.A.'s "Fuck tha Police" and the orchestral ABC News theme, "Majestic Fanfare", with the beat based on Prince's "Gett Off". McKercher followed with seven years at ABC radio. He has also worked as a free-lance record producer, engineer and mixer since 1992. For three weeks in 1993 McKercher recorded indie pop group Falling Joys' third studio album Aerial (August 1993). Using three different eight-track machines, at an isolated house in Kangaroo Valley, he captured the band live-in-the-studio.

In late 1997 Kercher was working at Woodstock Studios, Melbourne on pop rock band the Jaynes' extended play Dogbone (April 1998). He has written articles for Audio Technology Magazine. McKercher's techniques were discussed by Zolton Zavos in May 2000 in part one of "Making Tracks" in Tharunka on his work at Megaphon Studios, Petersham. Zavos acknowledged his "wonderful ear" when he worked as a producer, engineer and multi-instrumentalist.

In 2010 he addressed the Face the Music Conference. As from December 2016 he was a teacher at SAE Institute, Sydney delivering classes on "how to produce recordings" as well as continuing as a producer, engineer and mixer.

List of technical works

Awards and nominations

ARIA Music Awards 

! 
|-
| rowspan="2"|1995 ||rowspan="2"| himself || Engineer of the Year ||  ||rowspan="2"| 
|-
| Producer of the Year || 
|-
| 1996 || You Am I – Hourly, Daily || Engineer of the Year ||  || 
|-
| rowspan="2"|2001 || rowspan="2"| Augie March – Sunset Studies || Engineer of the Year ||  ||rowspan="2"| 
|-
| Producer of the Year || 
|-
| rowspan="2"|2003 || rowspan="2"| Pete Murray – Feeler || Engineer of the Year ||  ||rowspan="2"| 
|-
| Producer of the Year || 
|-
|rowspan="3"| 2004 || rowspan=2"|Eskimo Joe – A Song Is a City || Engineer of the Year ||  ||rowspan="3"| 
|-
| Producer of the Year || 
|-
| Pete Murray – "So Beautiful" || Producer of the Year || 
|-
|rowspan="4"| 2005 || rowspan="2"| Little Birdy – BigBigLove || Engineer of the Year ||  ||rowspan="4"| 
|-
| Producer of the Year || 
|-
|rowspan="2"| Eskimo Joe – "Older Than You" || Engineer of the Year || 
|-
| Producer of the Year || 
|-
|rowspan="2"| 2006 || rowspan=2"| Augie March – various tracks on Moo, You Bloody Choir || Engineer of the Year || 
|rowspan="2"| 
|-
| Producer of the Year || 
|-
| 2007 || Sarah Blasko – What the Sea Wants, the Sea Will Have || Engineer of the Year ||  || 
|-
| 2014 || Andy Bull – Sea of Approval || Engineer of the Year ||  || 
|-
| 2022
| Ball Park Music – Weirder & Weirder 
|  Mix Engineer – Best Mixed Album
| 
| 
|-

Notes

References

External links 

 

ARIA Award winners
Australian record producers
Living people
Year of birth missing (living people)